Unit is the second studio album by Australian rock band Regurgitator, released in November 1997. Its style is a mixture of 1980s style synthesised pop music and alternative rock, with some hip hop influences. The album debuted and peaked at number 4 on the ARIA Charts. At the ARIA Music Awards of 1998, the album won five ARIA Music Awards; including ARIA Award for Album of the Year.

In October 1998, the album was re-released as Unit Re-Booted, which included the album's five music videos.

The album was re-issued on vinyl by Valve in October 2013.

Prior to recording
Regurgitator had just completed their eleventh extensive Australian tour (with The Fauves and Tomorrow People), when they planned to start recording a follow-up to their first album, Tu-Plang. This was delayed when the band decided to make their third trip to America to do a tour with bands Helmet and The Melvins. Yeomans said of the tour, "I remember being completely frightened the whole time. They were real hard-arses. Helmet were a little army unit, and their fans were fucking really intense, really aggressive guys. Yeah, really full-on. So maybe it did have an effect." In 2008, manager Paul Curtis recalled that Yeomans had also stated "thank god Grinspoon came along because they took all the male angst away from our shows".

The Dirty Room
Upon return, the group rented a condemned warehouse in Brisbane's Fortitude Valley to write and record Unit. They affectionately named this studio "The Dirty Room". Yeomans said, "Martin did a lot of the set up – Magoo as well – and they put in carpet underlay that they'd found somewhere that was just filthy. Ergh! It had this real soporific effect as soon as you walked in and you just wanted to fall asleep. One of the funny stories is Rob Cavallo coming in to have a listen to one of the tracks, and he just fell asleep on this piss-stained mattress we had lying on the ground. It was a really dingy vibe."

Writing and recording 

Regurgitator had begun experimenting with drum machines and synthesizers on their first album, Tu-Plang. Amongst the gear that Yeomans and Ely were using at the time was the Clavia Nord Lead, the Akai S3000XL, the  Farfisa Super Bravo Organ and the newly released  Roland MC-303 "Groovebox, which featured on a number of tracks including "Unit" and "Polyester Girl". Ely stated that the track that ultimately helped the band decide the change in musical direction was the ironically-titled "I Like Your Old Stuff Better Than Your New Stuff", which began as a punk rock track with some keyboard but gradually "breaking it down with a more minimal keyboard heavy sound, leaving off most of the distorted guitar attack, and adding a vocoder gave the song something we were excited and terrified by at the same". After 6 weeks of recording, the album was completed on 2 August 1997.

Cover art
The cover is a large, plain yellow circle centred on a plain silver background. On the outside surface of the jewel CD case is a transparent sticker with the words "REGURGITATOR" and "UNIT" printed in black for identification in stores. This minimalist design, credited to "The Shits" (Quan Yeomans and Janet English) and Ben Ely, won the 1998 ARIA award for best cover art.

Unit Re-Booted has very similar cover art, and came in four bright colour variations – lime green, purple, royal blue and peach-orange. On the re-releases, the title text was printed directly onto the paper.

Track listing

Charts

Weekly charts

Year-end charts

Certifications

Legacy
In October 2010, the album was listed in the top 30 in the book, 100 Best Australian Albums. In July 2011, the album was voted 10th in Triple J's Hottest 100 Australian Albums of All Time. In December of 2021, the album was listed at no. 14 in Rolling Stone Australia’s ‘200 Greatest Albums of All Time’ countdown.

Release history

References

ARIA Award-winning albums
Regurgitator albums
1997 albums
East West Records albums